John Knight Waters (December 20, 1906 – January 9, 1989) was a United States Army four-star general who served as commander, U.S. Army, Pacific from 1964 to 1966. He was also the son-in-law of General George S. Patton. During World War II, he was taken prisoner while fighting in Tunisia in 1943, leading Patton to set up the controversial Task Force Baum to break him out.

Early career
Waters graduated from The Boys' Latin School in Baltimore in 1925 and then attended Johns Hopkins University in Maryland for two years before deciding he wanted a military career. He relocated to Illinois in order to obtain an appointment to the United States Military Academy, from which he graduated in 1931 with a commission in the cavalry.

World War II
Waters was captured in Tunisia at Dejebel Lassouda when German forces attacked Sidi bou Zid during World War II.

Waters, who had married General George S. Patton's daughter Beatrice in 1934, was one of many officers interned at Hammelburg. Patton claimed that he did not know that Waters was at OFLAG XIII-B and that he feared the Germans would execute the POWs rather than let them be liberated. According to some sources the Third Army had received intelligence that Waters was indeed at the camp, having recently been moved there from Oflag 64.

The task force, known as Task Force Baum, reached the camp, which was 50 miles behind the front lines, on 27 March 1945 with some losses after running into several German units detraining in a marshalling area. It had been shadowed by a German observation plane while en route, and its intentions were anticipated.

Lt. Donald Prell who was a POW with Waters at the camp, documented the events of that day, as did Father Paul. W. Cavanaugh, a U.S. Army Chaplain and fellow POW.  

Waters had been shot by a defending guard as he and a German officer were trying to contact the task force. Badly wounded, he was treated by a Serbian doctor, Colonel Radovan Danic, the chief surgeon of the former Yugoslavian Army, who was also interned at the camp. The camp was liberated about a week to ten days later, but the only prisoners there were badly wounded and sick, the rest (including the remnants of Task Force Baum) having been moved farther east.

Later career
Waters returned to duty in 1946 and became commandant of cadets at West Point.   In 1949 he became an hereditary member of the Maryland Society of the Cincinnati.

He was promoted to brigadier general in 1952 when he deployed to Korea as Chief of Staff for I Corps. His major command assignments include Commanding General for the 4th Armored Division and Commanding General for V Corps, both in Europe, as well as Commanding General for the Fifth United States Army, then headquartered in Chicago.

Significant other assignments for Waters were as Chief of the American Military Assistance Staff in Yugoslavia from 1955 to 1957, and as Deputy Chief of Staff for Materiel Developments, Fort Monroe, Virginia. He also commanded the latter unit before taking command of U.S. Army, Pacific in Hawaii. He retired on August 31, 1966.

Major awards for Waters include the Distinguished Service Cross for his actions leading fellow prisoners, the Army Distinguished Service Medal, the Silver Star, the Bronze Star, the Purple Heart, and the Korean Service Medal. He died on January 9, 1989, at the Walter Reed Army Medical Center in Washington, due to heart failure.

Family
He married Beatrice Patton, daughter of General George S. Patton, on June 27, 1934.  The wedding took place at St. John's Church in Beverly Farms, Massachusetts, with a reception immediately afterward at the Patton home of Green Meadows, South Hamilton, Massachusetts. The couple had two sons, John Knight and George Patton. The marriage lasted until her death on October 24, 1952.

Dates of rank

Notes

External links
The Hammelburg Raid
North County
 Historic footage of liberation of OFLAG XIII-B prison camp in 1945, where Lt. Col. John K. Waters was held.
Donald Prell 

United States Army personnel of World War II
United States Army generals
United States Military Academy alumni
Commandants of the Corps of Cadets of the United States Military Academy
World War II prisoners of war held by Germany
Recipients of the Distinguished Service Cross (United States)
Recipients of the Distinguished Service Medal (US Army)
American prisoners of war in World War II
Recipients of the Croix de Guerre (France)
1906 births
1989 deaths
Military personnel from Baltimore
Place of death missing
Recipients of the Silver Star
Army Black Knights men's ice hockey players